Down by Law is the debut studio album by Deadline, which was released on May 2, 1985, on Celluloid Records.

Track listing

Personnel 
Musicians
Paul Butterfield – harmonica (4)
Olu Dara – Holztrompete and cornet (2, 4)
Aïyb Dieng – congas and cowbell (1, 2), talking drums (4)
Manu Dibango – tenor saxophone (1, 2, 4), voice (1, 2)
Jonas Hellborg – bass guitar (3, 5), fuzz bass (3)
Bill Laswell – DMX (1, 2, 3, 4, 5), bass guitar (1), sortwave (3), producer
Jaco Pastorius – bass guitar (4)
Steve Turre – didjeridoo (2, 4, 6), conch shells (2, 6)
Bernie Worrell – synthesizer (1, 2, 4)
Phillip Wilson – DMX (1, 2, 3, 4, 5), percussion (2, 5, 6), Balafon (3, 4, 6), cymbals (1, 4), bells (3), bass synthesizer (4), mbira (5), processed piano (6), floor toms (6), congas (6), cabasa (6), producer
Technical personnel
Mike Krowiak – assistant engineer, editing
Robert Musso – engineering, mixing
Hahn Rowe – assistant engineer
Robert Stevens – engineering, processed piano (3), electric piano (6)
Howie Weinberg – mastering

Release history

References

External links 
 
 Down by Law at Bandcamp

1985 albums
Deadline (band) albums
Celluloid Records albums
Albums produced by Bill Laswell